Kollikodon is an extinct species of mammal, it is usually considered to be a member of Australosphenida and closely allied with monotremes, but is alternatively suggested to be a haramiyidan. It is known only from an opalised dentary fragment, with one premolar and two molars in situ, as well as a referred maxillary fragment containing the last premolar and all four molars. The fossils were found in the Griman Creek Formation at Lightning Ridge, New South Wales, Australia, as was Steropodon.
Kollikodon lived in the Late Cretaceous period, during the Cenomanian age (99–96 million years ago).

Etymology
Kollix is an ancient Greek word (κολλίξ) for a bread roll. The strange teeth of Kollikodon, when seen from above, resemble hot cross buns, traditionally toasted and eaten on Good Friday. Originally, Michael Archer wanted to name it "Hotcrossbunodon", but met disapproval from his associates.

Description 
Like Steropodon, Kollikodon was a relatively large mammal for the Mesozoic. The molars have a length of around 5.5 mm and a width of between about 4 and 6 mm. Based upon these data, the potential body length could be up to a metre. Assuming the accuracy of such a guess, Kollikodon would be a contender for the largest Mesozoic mammal known, along with other possible giants such as Repenomamus, Schowalteria, and Bubodens.

Aside from its size, it is difficult to say what Kollikodon looked like. It is certain that its teeth were specialised to crush food, being perhaps a shellfish-eater or herbivore. The description of the upper jaw showed that it was strongly specialised, with molars being subdivided into numerous rounded cuspules, some of which exhibit pits, possibly the result of crushing hard items.

In museums 
Both Kollikodon and Steropodon can be found at the Australian Museum in Sydney, along with Eric, the opalised pliosaur.

References

External links 

 Australian Museum online: Lightning Ridge Opal fossils from Oz.
 Australian Museum online Some observations on Hotcrossbunidon.
 Australian Museum online, Collection Highlights

Australosphenida
Cretaceous mammals of Australia
Prehistoric monotypic mammal genera
Fossil taxa described in 1995
Haramiyida